United States Junior records in athletics are the best marks set in an event by an athlete who holds American citizenship and who has not yet reached their 20th birthday in the given year of competition.  As of August 2018 these records are not exclusive to athletes who compete for the United States in international competition. Official records are kept and ratified by United States Track and Field.

Outdoor
Key:

Men

Women

Mixed

Indoor

Men

Women

Notes

References
General
Track and Field News: American U20 records – Men Outdoor 25 August 2022
Track and Field News: American U20 records – Women Outdoor 12 September 2022
Track and Field News: American U20 records – Men Indoor 8 March 2022
Track and Field News: American U20 records – Women Indoor 18 March 2021
USATF: American U20 Records 26 September 2022 updated
Specific

External links
USATF: American Records

Track and field in the United States
Track and field, junior
United Staets junior